Michael Brook (born 1951) is a Canadian guitarist, inventor, music producer, and film music composer. He plays in many genres, including rock, electronica, world music, minimalism and film scores. His collaborations with musicians around the world have made him "one of the most sought-after producers in the music industry." Born in Toronto, Ontario, Canada, Brook lives in Los Angeles. He is the creator of the Infinite Guitar.

Career 
Brook studied music and electronics at York University and worked as an engineer at the Grant Avenue studios, then owned by the Lanois brothers. Here he worked with Brian Eno, The Edge, Jon Hassell and Harold Budd. In 1985 he released his first solo album Hybrid, containing instrumental tracks with Indian and African elements.  

Another notable collaboration was Sleeps with the Fishes with Clan of Xymox member Pieter Nooten (4AD, 1987). He worked on the album Set by Youssou N'Dour, Miss America by Mary Margaret O'Hara and collaborated with Nusrat Fateh Ali Khan on the album Mustt Musst.  

He toured as a member of the Sylvian and Fripp tour group, with the final concert at the Royal Albert Hall in December 1994 documented on the album Damage: Live. He also opened the concerts with a solo set, featuring the Infinite Guitar with effects and sequencer backing. In 1998, he produced the album "Volcán: Tributo a José José", a tribute album to singer Jose Jose. In 2006, the solo album RockPaperScissors was released, with an ambient remix version following in 2007. Brook toured small venues in Canada and the United States in late January/early February, 2007. In writing about his score for the film 2015 film Brooklyn, Variety said the film was "buoyed along by a beautiful Michael Brook score  and The Hollywood Reporter praised his "evocative scoring."

Awards and honors
He was nominated for a Grammy Award in 1996 for his production work and as a co-artist on Pakistani singer Nusrat Fateh Ali Khan's album Night Song.

Brook's soundtrack to Into the Wild was nominated for a Golden Globe Award in 2008.

He also contributed a track to The Edge's soundtrack for the film Captive (1986). Brook's Infinite Guitar was later utilized by The Edge on U2's The Joshua Tree (1987).

Two films that he scored, Brooklyn and Aloft, premiered at the Sundance Film Festival in 2015.

He won ASCAP awards in 2011 for The Fighter and 2013 for The Vow. He won the Havana Film Festival award for best music in 2011 for El Infierno.

Selected discography

Studio and live albums

Soundtracks
Captive (1986) – co-writer/producer with The Edge.
Heat (1995)
Albino Alligator (1996)
Affliction (1997)
Crime and Punishment in Suburbia (2000)
Mission: Impossible 2 (2000)
Black Hawk Down (2001) - music composed by Hans Zimmer
Charlotte Sometimes (2002)
India: Kingdom of the Tiger (2002)
An Inconvenient Truth (2006)
Tre (2007)
Into the Wild (2007)
Americanese (2008)
Road, Movie (2009)
Morning (2010)
9500 Liberty (2010)
The Fighter (2010)
Country Strong (2010)
El Infierno (2010)
Darwin (2011)
Undefeated (2011)
The Perks of Being a Wallflower (2012)
Cas and Dylan (2013)
Aloft (2015)
Brooklyn (2015)
Tallulah (2016)
Stronger (2017)
My Days of Mercy (2017)
Le Brio (2017)
Giant Little Ones (2019)

See also 
List of ambient music artists

References

External links
 Michael Brook's Official Website
 

1951 births
Living people
Musicians from Toronto
Canadian guitarists
Canadian record producers
Canadian inventors
Real World Records artists
4AD artists
Canadian experimental musicians
All Saints Records artists
E.G. Records artists
Canadian film score composers
20th-century Canadian composers
21st-century Canadian composers
Best Original Score Genie and Canadian Screen Award winners